Erbo Graf von Kageneck (2 April 1918 – 12 January 1942) was a German fighter pilot during World War II. A flying ace, he was credited with 67 aerial victories and was a recipient of the Knight's Cross with Oak Leaves of Nazi Germany.

Early life
Kageneck was born on 2 April 1918 in Bonn, at the time in the Rhine Province of the German Empire. He was the fourth of six children of Generalmajor Karl Graf von Kageneck and Freiin Maria von Schorlemer, daughter of Clemens Freiherr von Schorlemer-Lieser, an Imperial Secretary of Agriculture. He first name was Arbogast in homage to a distant 10th century Kageneck knight, which was quickly summed up to Erbo. His brothers included Clemens-Heinrich Graf von Kageneck (1913–2005), a captain in the army, and August von Kageneck (1922–2004), a lieutenant in the army, later a journalist and writer.

World War II
Kageneck joined the German air force, the Luftwaffe, in 1936. At the outbreak of World War II, he served with Jagdgeschwader 1 (JG 1—1st Fighter Wing). On 5 July 1940, the Jagdwaffe (fighter force) of the Luftwaffe was reorganized and in consequence the I. Gruppe of JG 1 became the III. Gruppe of  Jagdgeschwader 27 (JG 27—27th Fighter Wing), subsequently his 2. Staffel of JG 1 became the 8. Staffel of JG 27. Two weeks later, on 19 July, Kageneck was wounded in aerial combat east of the Isle of Wight while flying a Messerschmitt Bf 109 E-4. It is possible, that his opponent may have been Pilot Officer Frank Reginald Carey who claimed to have scored hits on two and to have shot down one Bf 109 that day.

On 18 September 1940, Kageneck was appointed Staffelkapitän (squadron leader) of 9. Staffel of JG 27, replacing Oberleutnant Max Dobislav who was transferred. He was promoted to Oberleutnant (first lieutenant) on 1 October 1940. On 10 November, III. Gruppe was withdrawn from Channel operations. The Gruppe was first ordered to Diepholz Airfield and then to Vechta for a period of replenishment and equipment overhaul.

Balkan and Malta
In January 1941, JG 27 was ordered to relocate to Romania. Between 12 and 14 January, the ground personnel of III. Gruppe arrived in Bucharest-Băneasa, preparing for the arrival of the air elements which relocated on 2 February. Shortly after, the Gruppe moved to Giulești.

Following the Balkans campaign, III. Gruppe was briefly deployed to Sicily for actions against Malta. On 2 May, the Gruppe transferred to Gela and flew its first combat mission to Malta on 6 May, escorting Heinkel He 111 bombers from Kampfgeschwader 26 (KG 26—26th Bomber Wing). That day, Kageneck claimed a Hurricane shot down near Luqa. According to Shores, it is likely that his opponent was Pilot Officer Alan Sydney Dredge from No. 261 Squadron who made a forced landing in his Hurricane Z3057 and sustained severe burns. On 20 May, Kageneck claimed III. Gruppes last aerial victory over Malta when he shot down Pilot Officer Anthony John Reeves from No. 261 Squadron flying Hurricane N2673. On 24 May, III. Gruppe left Sicily and returned to Germany.

Operation Barbarossa
In June, the Wehrmacht was preparing for Operation Barbarossa, the German invasion of the Soviet, and consolidating its forces near the border established in the German–Soviet Frontier Treaty. On 4 June, III. Gruppe arrived at Suwałki before being redeployed to Sobolewo on 12 June. At the start of the invasion, JG 27, with the exception of I. Gruppe, was subordinated to VIII. Fliegerkorps (8th Air Corps) and was deployed in the northern sector of Army Group Centre. On 22 June 1941, the opening day of Operation Barbarossa, III. Gruppe flew many ground support missions against Soviet airfields and forces, its first just past 03:00. Later in the day, Kageneck shot down a Tupolev SB bomber south of Vilnius.

Following his 37th aerial victory, he was awarded the Knight's Cross of the Iron Cross on 30 July 1941. The following day, III. Gruppe moved to an airfield at Soltsy, located west of Lake Ilmen. From this airfield, the Gruppe fought over the combat areas near Staraya Russa, south of Lake Ilmen, and Veliky Novgorod which is north of Lake Ilmen. On 10 August, Kageneck claimed a SB-3 bomber shot down. He became an "ace-in-a-day" on 14 August, claiming his 39th to 43rd aerial victory. On 20 August, Kageneck made a forced landing in his Bf 109 E-4 (Werknummer 1326—factory number) near Chudovo. Kageneck had logged his 300th combat mission in this aircraft.

On 16 October, General der Flieger Wolfram Freiherr von Richthofen discharged III. Gruppe at Stabna, located just north of Smolensk, from operations on the Eastern Front. By this date, Kageneck had claimed 48 Soviet victories and — with his total now at 65 — was awarded the Knight's Cross of the Iron Cross with Oak Leaves on 26 October 1941. He was the 39th member of the German armed forces to be so honored.

North Africa and death
Following the withdrawal from the Eastern Front, III. Gruppe had been moved to Döberitz on 26 October. There, the Gruppe was equipped with the Bf 109 F-4 trop and began training for deployment to the Mediterranean theatre. On 5 November, Kageneck, together with Hauptmann Gordon Gollob, received the Oak Leaves from Adolf Hitler personally at the Wolf's Lair, Hitler's headquarters in Rastenburg, present-day Kętrzyn in Poland. On 6 December, III. Gruppe transferred to North Africa where they were based at Timimi, Libya.

Kageneck claimed his last two aerial victories against British Commonwealth fighters on 12 December. That day, he claimed a Hurricane and Curtiss P-40 Warhawk fighter shot down near Timimi. On 24 December, Kageneck was seriously wounded in combat with several Desert Air Force (DAF) P-40 and Hurricane fighters south of Agedabia. Both Sergeant Maxwell of No. 94 Squadron and Pilot Officer Thompson No. 229 Squadron made claims for a fighter shot down in the same action. Many years later, some sources, including Kageneck's brother, August von Kageneck, claimed that the shots which hit Erbo were fired by the pre-eminent Australian ace of the war, Clive Caldwell. The main reason for this was that Caldwell favoured attacks from beneath his opponents, which was precisely the fashion in which Kageneck's wounds were sustained.

Kageneck sustained severe injuries in combat near Agedabia resulting in a forced landing of his Bf 109 F-4 trop (Werknummer 8554) in the desert near El Magrun where he was recovered by Italian soldiers. He was immediately evacuated, first to a hospital in Athens, and then to another in Naples where, despite intensive care, he died of his wounds to his stomach and abdomen on 12 January 1942. He was posthumously promoted to Hauptmann (captain).

Summary of career

Aerial victory claims
According to US historian David T. Zabecki, Kageneck was credited with 67 aerial victories. Spick also lists him with 67 aerial victories, claimed in an unknown number of combat missions, 19 on the Western Front - including four over Malta and two in North Africa - and 48 on the Eastern Front. Mathews and Foreman, authors of Luftwaffe Aces — Biographies and Victory Claims, researched the German Federal Archives and found records for 66 aerial victory claims. This number includes 19 claims over the Western Allies and 47 on the Eastern Front.

Awards
Iron Cross (1939)
 2nd Class (14 May 1940)
 1st Class (11 July 1940)
Knight's Cross of the Iron Cross with Oak Leaves
 Knight's Cross on 30 July 1941 as Oberleutnant and Staffelkapitän of the 9./Jagdgeschwader 27
 39th Oak Leaves on 26 October 1941 as Oberleutnant and Staffelkapitän of the 9./Jagdgeschwader 27

Dates of rank

Notes

References

Citations

Bibliography

 
 
 
 
 
 
 
 
 
 
 
 
 
 
 
 
 
 
 
 

 

1918 births
1942 deaths
Counts of Germany
Military personnel from Bonn
People from the Rhine Province
German World War II flying aces
Recipients of the Knight's Cross of the Iron Cross with Oak Leaves
Luftwaffe personnel killed in World War II